Retsos is a surname. Notable people with the surname include:

Christos Retsos (born 2001), Greek footballer 
Panagiotis Retsos (born 1998), Greek footballer